NCRI may refer to:

National Cancer Research Institute
National Council of Resistance of Iran